A Pair of Spectacles is a 1916 British silent comedy film directed by Alexander Butler and starring John Hare, Peggy Hyland and Booth Conway, based on the play of the same name by Sydney Grundy. It was made at Isleworth Studios.

Cast
 John Hare as Benjamin Goldfinch 
 Peggy Hyland as Mrs. Goldfinch  
 Booth Conway as Uncle Gregory 
 James Le Fane as Ben Goldfinch

References

Bibliography
 Harris, Ed. Britain's Forgotten Film Factory: The Story of Isleworth Studios. Amberley Publishing, 2013.

External links

1916 films
1916 comedy films
British silent feature films
British comedy films
Films directed by Alexander Butler
Films shot at Isleworth Studios
British black-and-white films
1910s English-language films
1910s British films
Silent comedy films